Študlov is a municipality and village in Zlín District in the Zlín Region of the Czech Republic. It has about 500 inhabitants.

History
The first written mention of Študlov is from 1422.

From 1 January 2021, Študlov is no longer a part of Vsetín District and belongs to Zlín District.

References

Villages in Zlín District
Moravian Wallachia